Yann Emmanuel Affi (born 11 November 1995) is an Ivorian professional footballer who plays as a centre-back for AC Oulu.

References

External links 
 

1995 births
Living people
Ivorian footballers
Association football defenders
Ivorian expatriate footballers
Expatriate footballers in Belarus
Expatriate footballers in Finland
FC Torpedo-BelAZ Zhodino players
FC Dynamo Brest players
FC Gomel players
AC Oulu players